Marianne Steinbrecher (born August 23, 1983) is a Brazilian volleyball player, who plays as a wing spiker at Molico/Osasco. She represented her native country at the 2008 Summer Olympics in Beijing, China, in which she helped her country win the gold medal.

Life and career
Born in São Paulo, Steinbrecher, who is of Russian and German descent, started playing volleyball when she was 14 years old. After playing for Rolândia/Faccar and Grêmio Londrinense, she professionalized while playing for Osasco. Playing for Osasco, she won the Salonpas Cup in 2001, in 2002 and in 2005, the Campeonato Paulista in 2003, and the Superliga in 2003–04. In 2006, she left Osasco and joined Italian club Scavolini Pesaro. In 2008, she returned to Brazil to play for São Caetano/Blausiegel in the Copa Brasil.
In 2010, she signed a contract with the Brazilian club Unilever Volley. She played with Fenerbahçe in the 2012 FIVB Club World Championship held in Doha, Qatar and helped her team to win the bronze medal after defeating Puerto Rico's Lancheras de Cataño 3–0.

National team

Playing for the national team, she won the FIVB World Grand Prix in 2004, in 2006, in 2008 and in 2009. In the 2008 FIVB World Grand Prix, she was awarded the competition's Most Valuable Player (MVP). Steinbrecher participated in the 2004 Summer Olympics, in which her country finished in the fourth place, after being defeated by Cuba in the bronze medal match. In the 2007 Pan American Games, she won the silver medal, after her country was defeated by Cuba in the final. In 2008, on her birthday, in Beijing, Steinbrecher won her first gold medal in the Olympic Games, after her country beat the United States 3–1 in the gold medal match.

Mari took part of the National Team who won the gold medal at the 2011 Pan American Games held in Guadalajara, Mexico.

Personal life
Mariane came out when the newspaper Extra reported her and her girlfriend.

Awards

Individuals
 2003–04 Brazilian Superliga – "Best Scorer" 
 2003–04 Brazilian Superliga – "Best Spiker" 
 2004–05 Brazilian Superliga – "Best Server" 
 2006 Pan-American Cup – "Most Valuable Player"
 2006 Pan-American Cup – "Best Spiker" 2008 World Grand Prix – "Most Valuable Player" 2011 South American Championship – "Best Spiker" 2015 South American Club Championship – "Best Opposite Spiker"''

Clubs
 2001–02 Brazilian Superliga –  Runner-up, with Vôlei Osasco
 2002–03 Brazilian Superliga –  Champion, with Vôlei Osasco
 2003–04 Brazilian Superliga –  Champion, with Vôlei Osasco
 2004–05 Brazilian Superliga –  Champion, with Vôlei Osasco
 2007–08 Italian Serie A1 –  Champion, with Scavolini Pesaro
 2010–11 Brazilian Superliga –  Champion, with Unilever Vôlei
 2011–12 Brazilian Superliga –  Runner-up, with Unilever Vôlei
 2014–15 Brazilian Superliga –  Runner-up, with Molico Osasco
 2015 South American Club Championship –  Champion, with Molico Osasco
 2012–13 Women's CEV Cup –  Runner-up, with Fenerbahçe
 2012 FIVB Club World Championship –  Bronze medal, with Fenerbahçe

References

External links
 
 
 
 

1983 births
Living people
Brazilian women's volleyball players
Volleyball players at the 2004 Summer Olympics
Volleyball players at the 2008 Summer Olympics
Olympic volleyball players of Brazil
Olympic gold medalists for Brazil
Sportspeople from São Paulo
Brazilian people of German descent
Brazilian people of Russian descent
Volleyball players at the 2007 Pan American Games
Volleyball players at the 2011 Pan American Games
Olympic medalists in volleyball
Fenerbahçe volleyballers
Medalists at the 2008 Summer Olympics
Pan American Games gold medalists for Brazil
Pan American Games silver medalists for Brazil
Pan American Games medalists in volleyball
Lesbian sportswomen
Brazilian LGBT sportspeople
LGBT volleyball players
Opposite hitters
Outside hitters
Expatriate volleyball players in Italy
Expatriate volleyball players in Turkey
Brazilian expatriates in Italy
Brazilian expatriate sportspeople in Turkey
Medalists at the 2011 Pan American Games